Global Release Day (alternatively known as New Music Fridays) is a set international day for releasing of music singles and albums. The new global release day went into effect on 10 July 2015 in more than 45 major recorded music markets worldwide with new music being released on a Friday as part of 'New Music Fridays'. 

The official announcement was made on 11 June 2015 by International Federation of the Phonographic Industry (IFPI), which represents the worldwide recording industry. The move means that new music will be available on the same day worldwide rather than on varying national release days, being Mondays for releases in France and the United Kingdom, Tuesdays in United States and Canada and Fridays, for example in Germany and Australia.

Music releases are now uniformly available around the world on Fridays at 00:01 local time in all 45 signatory countries. Of these, 11 countries already had their release music on Fridays, while the remaining markets had to switch their day of release when the new albums and singles would become available. This move effectively ends the earlier phenomenon where new music was unavailable in one country when it was legally available elsewhere. 

However, in some markets, in particular, Asia, music intended for local markets will continue to be released on other days. For example, domestic artists in Japan will continue to release new music on Wednesdays, two days earlier than music from international markets.

The move has changed earlier traditional days where charts were being published as the official country charts try to adapt to the new "global day" for releases such that they capture a full week's sales and streaming from Friday mornings to Thursday nights. The UK Top 100, for example, published by The Official Charts moved from being published on a Sunday to a Friday with the BBC moving its new Top 40 charts program from Sundays at 4 p.m. local time to Fridays at 4 p.m. local time.

References

External links
 Official website

Music events
Music industry